is a Japanese footballer who plays as a forward for  club Iwaki FC.

Youth career
Tanimura was captain of his high school team before moving on to Kokushikan University.
He scored on his debut for his university, after coming on as a substitute in a 3–2 JUFA Kanto League 1 game against Sendai University. However, he did not play regularly for Kokushikan in his first or second year, only making four appearances in 2016 and 2017. From 2019, Tanimura did start to get more game time and made 10 appearances in 2018 scoring 1 goal, and a further 21 appearances in 2019 scoring 4 goals. He also received his first red card in his career in his final year. All in all, he represented his university 35 times, scoring 6 goals.

Club career
In 2020, Tanimura moved to the Japan Football League club Iwaki FC. He made his debut for the club in August 2020, coming on as a late substitute in a 4-1 league defeat to Verspah Oita. On his first start in the following month, Tanimura scored his first goals for Iwaki, scoring two goals in a 4–3 league victory over Kochi United SC. Tanimura went on to make a few more short appearances throughout the rest of the season, playing 9 times across all competitions, scoring 3 goals in total.

In 2021, he played 24 games and scored 6 goals, as Iwaki were crowned champions of the JFL and were promoted to the J3 League for the first time in their history.

In 2022, Tanimura was largely used as an impact player from the bench in his first season in the J3 League. In spite of his relatively low amount of minutes played, he did manage to score 6 goals during the season, all of which came from appearing as a substitite. He appeared in 29 games as Iwaki were crowned champions of the J3 League and were promoted to the J2 League for the first time in their history. On 12 December 2022, Tanimura renewed his contract with club for the 2023 season.

He scored on the opening match of the 2023 season in a 3–2 defeat to Fujieda MYFC.

Career statistics

Club
.

Honours

 Iwaki FC
Japan Football League : 2021
J3 League : 2022

Personal life
His elder brother Kenichi Tanimura is also a footballer who has played in the J.League.

References

External links
Profile at J.League

1998 births
Living people
Japanese footballers
Association football forwards
Association football people from Iwate Prefecture
Kokushikan University alumni
Iwaki FC players
J3 League players
J2 League players